Roderick Finlay Morrison (October 7, 1925 – October 10, 1998) was a Canadian ice hockey player who played 34 games in the National Hockey League with the Detroit Red Wings during the 1947–48 season. The rest of his career, which lasted from 1943 to 1951, was spent in the minor leagues. Morrison was born in Saskatoon, Saskatchewan.

Career statistics

Regular season and playoffs

External links
 

1925 births
1998 deaths
Canadian ice hockey right wingers
Detroit Red Wings players
Ice hockey people from Saskatchewan
Indianapolis Capitals players
Omaha Knights (USHL) players
Sportspeople from Saskatoon